The Saint Louis Billikens men's soccer team is an intercollegiate varsity sports team of Saint Louis University. The Billikens compete in the Atlantic 10 Conference in the National Collegiate Athletic Association Division I.

Noted for their dominance in men's collegiate soccer during the late 1950s through the mid-1970s, the Billikens have won 10 NCAA Men's Soccer Championships, the most of any men's college soccer program. Despite this, the Billikens have not appeared in an NCAA national championship final since 1974, and have appeared in the college cup twice since then: 1991 and 1997. Of their ten titles, nine were outright earned by the Billikens and their 1972 title was shared with San Francisco Dons. During their dynasty run from the 1960s through 1970s, the team was coached by Bob Guelker during their first five championships, while Harry Keough coached the last five championship teams at SLU. Mike McGinty was the most recent head coach, serving from March 2010 until November 2017 when his contract was not renewed. Presently, the Billikens are coached by Kevin Kalish, who was named head coach on January 20, 2018.

The Billikens' fielded their first varsity team in 1959.

Seasons

Totals

References 

Saint Louis Billikens soccer seasons
Saint Louis Billikens